Victoria A. Graffeo (born 1952) is a former judge of the New York State's Court of Appeals. Judge Graffeo was appointed to the court by Republican Governor George Pataki in 2000 for a 14-year term. Governor Andrew Cuomo declined to appoint her to a second term, and she left the bench on November 29, 2014.

Education
Graffeo graduated from the State University of New York at Oneonta in 1974. She earned her law degree from Albany Law School three years later.

Legal experience
She was in private practice (1978–1982) before entering government service in 1982 as an assistant counsel to the New York State Division of Alcoholism and Alcohol Abuse.

She served as counsel to then New York State Assembly Minority Leader Pro Tempore Kemp Hannon (1984) and as chief counsel to then Assembly Minority Leader Clarence D. Rappleyea, Jr. (1989–1994).

On January 1, 1995, she was appointed Solicitor General for the State of New York by Attorney General Dennis C. Vacco and served in that capacity until appointed, in September 1996, by Governor George E. Pataki to fill a vacancy in the State Supreme Court, Third Judicial District.

She was elected that November to a full term as Justice of New York's State Supreme Court and, in March 1998, became an associate justice of the Appellate Division of the Supreme Court, Third Judicial Department.

Her selection for a 14-year term to New York State's Court of Appeals, also by Governor Pataki, was confirmed by the New York State Senate on November 29, 2000. Judge Graffeo applied to the New York State Commission on Judicial Nominations to be considered for appointment to a second term. The Commission included Graffeo on its list of seven candidates for the position. Governor Andrew Cuomo declined to reappoint Graffeo and instead selected Appellate Division, Third Department Justice Leslie E. Stein for the position. Stein's nomination was confirmed by the New York State Senate on January 9, 2015.

Personal life
Victoria Graffeo, who comes from an Italian American family, resides in Guilderland, New York.

References

External links
Albany Law School website
JUDGE VICTORIA A. GRAFFEO: COMMITTED, CONSERVATIVE, COLLEGIAL

1952 births
Living people
Albany Law School alumni
American jurists
American people of Italian descent
American women judges
Judges of the New York Court of Appeals
New York (state) lawyers
People from Guilderland, New York
People from Rockville Centre, New York
Solicitors General of New York (state)
State University of New York at Oneonta alumni
21st-century American women
20th-century American women judges
20th-century American judges
21st-century American women judges
21st-century American judges